John William Olson (10 October 1916 – 13 November 2008) was an Australian politician who represented the South Australian House of Assembly seat of Semaphore for the Labor Party from 1973 to 1979.

See also
1973 Semaphore state by-election

References

1916 births
2008 deaths
Australian Labor Party members of the Parliament of South Australia
Members of the South Australian House of Assembly
20th-century Australian politicians